The Chitral Press Club of Chitral District, Khyber Pakhtunkhwa, Pakistan, is the representative body of journalists based in Chitral and Upper Chitral.

It has an elected governing body represented by the following people:

 Zahiruddin of Daily Dawn (President)
 Saifur Rehman Aziz of Samaa TV (Senior Vice President)
 Mian Asif Ali Shah Kakakhel of PTV (Vice President)
 Abdul Ghafar of Daily Jihad (General Secretary),
 Syed Nazir Hussain Shah of Mashriq TV (Finance Secretary)
 Noor Afzal Khan of Daily Aaj (Office Secretary).

References

Pakistani journalism organisations
Chitral District
Press clubs